Hendrik Bernardus van der Walt (born ) is a South African professional rugby union player for  in the Rugby Pro D2 in France. His regular position is flanker or number eight.

Career

Youth and Varsity Cup rugby

Van der Walt went to Afrikaanse Hoër Seunskool in Pretoria, where he earned a selection into the  side that played at the Under-18 Craven Week competitions in both 2009 and 2010. In 2010, he was also selected in a South African Under-18 High Performance squad that played matches against Namibia, France and England.

He made ten appearances for the  side in the 2013 Under-21 Provincial Championship, once again finishing as a losing finalist.

Blue Bulls

Van der Walt was named in the  squad prior to the 2015 Super Rugby season.

Griquas

Van der Walt joined Kimberley-based side  prior to the 2015 Currie Cup qualification series, signing a deal until October 2015.

Pumas

Aurillac

Van der Walt moved to French Pro D2 side  after the 2018 Currie Cup Premier Division.

References

South African rugby union players
Living people
1992 births
People from Rustenburg
Rugby union flankers
Rugby union number eights
Blue Bulls players
Bulls (rugby union) players
Rugby union players from North West (South African province)